Obizzo III d'Este (14 July 1294 – 20 March 1352) was the Marquess of Ferrara from 1317 until his death.

He was the son of Aldobrandino II d'Este and Alda Rangoni.

Life

Obizzo was lord of Ferrara together with his brothers Rinaldo and Niccolò, and his cousin Folco II, but in the end reigned as sole ruler. He managed to enlarge the family possessions with the conquests of Modena (1336) and Parma (1344–1346).

In May 1317 Obizzo married firstly Giacoma (d. 1341), daughter of Romeo de' Peppoli from Bologna, with whom he had no children. There are also reports that he married Elisabeth of Saxony, Angria and Westphalia, daughter of Albert II, Duke of Saxony.

In 1347 Obizzo married secondly Lippa Ariosti, known as la Bella and his long-time mistress. The marriage took place shortly before Lippa's death on 27 November 1347 in order to legitimize their many children:

 Beatrice (18 September 1332 – 1387), married in 1365 to Waldemar I, Prince of Anhalt-Zerbst.
 Alda (18 July 1333 – 1381), married in 1356 to Ludovico II Gonzaga.
 Rinaldo (10 October 1334 – 20 July 1348), died young.
 Aldobrandino III (14 September 1335 – 2/3 November 1361).
 Alisia (18 March 1337 – 12 August 1402), married in 1349 to Guido III Novello di Polenta, Lord of Ravenna.
 Niccolò II (17 May 1338 – 26 March 1388).
 Azzo (14 March 1340 – 18 September 1349), died in infancy.
 Folco (1342–1356), died young.
 Costanza (25 July 1343 – 13 February 1391), married in 1363 to Malatesta IV Malatesta, Lord of Rimini.
 Alberto (1347 – 30 July 1393).

In addition, Obizzo had another illegitimate son by an unknown mistress, Giovanni (1324–1389), later Governor of Frignano, who was also legitimized.

References

1294 births
1352 deaths
Obizzo 3
Obizzo 3
14th-century Italian nobility